Belle Prairie Township is one of fifteen townships in Fillmore County, Nebraska, United States. The population was 114 at the 2020 census.

The village of Strang lies within the township.

References

External links
City-Data.com

Townships in Fillmore County, Nebraska
Townships in Nebraska